Cornelis "Cees" Berkhouwer  (19 March 1919, Alkmaar – 5 October 1992, Alkmaar) was a Dutch politician.

He was a Member of the European Parliament between 1964 and 1984, for the Dutch People's Party for Freedom and Democracy, which sat as part of the Liberal Democrat group in the Parliament. Between 13 March 1973 and 10 March 1975, he served as President of the European Parliament.

References

 Profile on the European Parliament website
 Biography (Dutch)

1919 births
1992 deaths
People's Party for Freedom and Democracy politicians
Presidents of the European Parliament
People from Alkmaar
People's Party for Freedom and Democracy MEPs
Municipal councillors in North Holland
MEPs for the Netherlands 1958–1979
MEPs for the Netherlands 1979–1984